Q-School 2017 – Event 1 was the first of two qualifying tournaments for the 2017–18 snooker season. It took place from 9 to 14 May 2017 at Preston Guild Hall in Preston, England.

The winners of the quarterfinals, Lukas Kleckers, Allan Taylor, Billy Joe Castle and Ashley Hugill, all qualified to receive professional snooker tour cards for the 2017/2018 and 2018/2019 seasons.

Main draw

Round 1

Best of 7 frames

Section 1

Section 2

Section 3

Section 4

Century breaks

 140, 133  Sean O'Sullivan
 128  Hu Hao
 127  Lu Ning
 121  Tugba Irten
 116, 108  Jamie Cope
 109  Simon Lichtenberg
 107  Chen Zifan
 104  Alex Davies
 102  Ashley Hugill
 100  Simon Bedford
 100  Phil O'Kane
 100  Zack Richardson

References

Snooker competitions in England
Q School (snooker)
2017 in snooker
2017 in English sport
Sport in Preston
May 2017 sports events in the United Kingdom